Paper Castles is the second studio album by South African singer-songwriter Alice Phoebe Lou. She self-released it on March 8, 2019 by buying the CD and vinyl manufacturing services from Motor Entertainment.

On 4 December 2019 Paper Castles album was listed at number 19 in the NBHAP magazine's 50 best albums of 2019 list.

Track listing

References

2019 albums
Self-released albums